This is a list of notable events in country music that took place in the year 1929.

Events 
December – Release in the United States of short film The Singing Brakeman starring country singer Jimmie Rodgers.

Top Hillbilly (Country) Recordings

The following songs were extracted from records included in Joel Whitburn's Pop Memories 1890-1954, record sales reported on the "Discography of American Historical Recordings" website, and other sources as specified. Numerical rankings are approximate, they are only used as a frame of reference.

Births 
 January 17 – Grady Martin, session guitarist and member of Nashville's "A Team" (died 2001)
 March 13 – Jan Howard, Grand Ole Opry star. Best known for "Evil on Your Mind" (died 2020).
 March 27 – Don Warden, best known for his years on The Porter Wagoner Show and as the manager of Wagoner and Dolly Parton (died 2017).
 May 1 – Sonny James, singer of the 1950s through early 1980s who once had 16 consecutive No. 1 songs—many of them covers of pop hits—on the Billboard Hot Country Singles chart; "The Southern Gentleman". (died 2016)
 June 23 – June Carter Cash, member of the legendary Carter Family and wife of Johnny Cash (died 2003)
July 9 – Jesse McReynolds, Grand Ole Opry star. 
 August 12 – Buck Owens, key innovator of the "Bakersfield Sound," which resulted in immense popularity from the 1960s onward; co-host of Hee Haw from 1969–1986. (died 2006)

Deaths

References

Further reading 
 Kingsbury, Paul, "Vinyl Hayride: Country Music Album Covers 1947–1989," Country Music Foundation, 2003
 Millard, Bob, "Country Music: 70 Years of America's Favorite Music," HarperCollins, New York, 1993
 Whitburn, Joel. "Top Country Songs 1944–2005 – 6th Edition." 2005.

Country
Country music by year